The Battle of Capakhchur took place between the Qara Qoyunlu and the Timurids in 1387.

Political situation before the battle 

in 1386-1388, Timur organized marches to Iran and Azerbaijan. in 1386, Timur, who was on his way to Samarkand, he first attacked Malik Izzeddin, the judge of Luristan. After Malik exiles his Izzadin and his family to Turkestan, he goes to Azerbaijan to fulfill his second destiny. On this eve, he receives news that the " Ahmad Jalayir" will come to Tabriz. However,Ahmad Jalayirheads towards Baghdad with the news of Timur's expedition to this region. Timur advanced towards Nakhchivan and Kars and captured these places. Later, Timur; headed to Georgia and Eastern Anatolia, he captured the castles of Avnik, Mush, Van, Ahlat here. While Timur was continuing this progress, the khan of the Golden Horde, Tokhtamysh , attacked Tabriz. Timur, who hears the news of Tokhtamysh's plundering of Tabriz, also turns to Tabriz. before 1387, while Timur was in Karabakh, he fled to Derbent in Toktamysh and came to the Samur stream.

In the battle that breaks out between the parties, Tokhtamysh is forced to retreat.Then the danger of Timur arises for Qara Qoyunlu. Timur Qara Qoyunlu accuses the caravans of sultan Kara Mehmed of raiding trade caravans. But of course it was an excuse. The main reason for Timur's attack was to prevent the establishment of an independent state in Eastern Anatolia and to make the Qara Qoyunlu Turcoman dependent on him.

Battle of Capakhchur 
The parties faced off in the region called Capakhchur Suyu in Bingol. After Timur established his headquarters here, he separated 3 divisions from the army and sent them to Kara Mehmed. His son Miran Shah was at the head of one of these divisions. The Miranshah who walks over Kara Mehmed who is taken to the defense obtains many spoils. But Kara Mehmed retreated at one time and held the george and valleys around Capakchur and scattered Timur's army.

After this victory, Kara Mehmed took refuge in Malatya Mebiusu Mintas Mamluks. Metsoplu Toma wrote this defeated of Timur like this." Timur marched on Kara Mehmed with a large army in the spring. And as soon as he hears this news, Kara Mehmed runs away. Tamerlane overtook him, following him, and a few days later he caught up with him in the province of Breagjur. In this situation, Kara Mehmed sends his soldiers on Timur, defeating him and killing Lokmaka, the general  of his army. And he destroys a large part of his mens.''

References

External links 

Battles involving the Timurid Empire
Capakhchur